Victorian College of the Arts Secondary School (VCASS), is a government-funded co-educational selective and specialist secondary day school, with speciality in the performing and visual arts, located within the Melbourne Arts Precinct in Southbank, Melbourne, Victoria, Australia. Founded in 1978, VCASS teaches students from Year 7 to Year 12; and has an enrolment of 370 students.

Students are accepted after annual auditions and interviews. All students share academic subjects, but follow either a specialised dance, music, theatre arts or visual arts training program for half the day. The school also provides academic classes to secondary students from other institutions including the Australian Ballet School, and Gymnastics Victoria.

History 
Instigated by the former tertiary institution Victorian College of the Arts (VCA), as a separate and complementary institution, VCASS was founded in 1978 by Lenton Parr and Jack Pitt (as the Victorian College of the Arts Technical School - VCATS). This was the same year that the tertiary VCA commenced its dance faculty, and VCATS was conceived as a preparatory school for the tertiary dance and music courses. In 1981 the name was changed to VCASS. For most of its history VCASS shared its campus and buildings with the tertiary VCA at 234 St Kilda Road, but in June 2009 moved to new purpose built premises at 57 Miles Street, Southbank.

The Dance and Music specialist programs run in parallel from Year 7 to 12. In 2013 the school added a Year 11 intake for its Visual Arts program. In 2016 a new Theatre Arts program commenced with a Year 11 intake.

Academics
Victorian Certificate of Education (VCE) studies offered by the school:Art, Biology, Chemistry, Dance, Drama, English, English (EAL), French, Further Mathematics, General Mathematics, Health and Human Development, History: 20th Century (1900-1945), History: 20th Century (since 1945), History: Revolutions, Literature, Mathematical Methods (CAS), Media, Music Investigation, Music Performance, Music Style and Composition, Philosophy, Physics, Psychology, Studio Arts and Theatre Arts.

Some students study additional languages via Distance Education Victoria, such as Mandarin, Korean, Japanese, Indonesian, German or Spanish.

In 2011, the VCE median study score was 34, and 27 percent of students achieved a study score above 40.

Notable alumni

 Zoë Blackviolinist
 Rebecca Chamberspianist, 1995 Young Australian of the Year
 Aaron Choulaipianist, composer
 Natalie Gaucivocalist
 Aura Gopianist
 Greg Horsmandancer and choreographer, former principal Australian Ballet and Senior Principal English National Ballet
 Charlotte Nicdaoactor
 Marshall McGuireharpist
 Patrick Savagefilm composer and former principal first violin with the Royal Philharmonic Orchestra

See also

 List of schools in Victoria, Australia
 Performing arts education in Australia
 Visual arts education in Australia

References

External links 
 

Victorian College of the Arts Secondary School
Dance education in Australia
Educational institutions established in 1978
Music schools in Australia
Performing arts education in Australia
Public high schools in Melbourne
Schools of the performing arts in Australia
Selective schools in Victoria (Australia)
Southbank, Victoria
Buildings and structures in the City of Melbourne (LGA)